The Imbible: A Spirited History of Drinking is an educational entertainment musical with book and new lyrics by Anthony Caporale, and original musical arrangements by Josh Ehrlich and Anthony Caporale. Best known for creating the Video Podcast Art of the Drink, Caporale selected the music and created new arrangements with Ehrlich, an arranger for Voices of Gotham. The Imbible tells the story of how Western Civilization has been influenced by the introduction of alcohol consumption. Caporale is supported in the lead role by a trio of waiters who also serve as clowns, Greek chorus, and round out the parts of a barbershop quartet called The Backwaiters.

History 
The Imbible was conceived by Anthony Caporale, a noted bar chef, beverage specialist and founder of Broadway Theatre Studio, a new play development workshop based in Manhattan. Development on the show began in 2011, following Caporale's Science of Mixology seminar at the Manhattan Cocktail Classic beverage show. Caporale based the book on the many presentations he developed as the National Brand Ambassador for Drambuie as well as classes he taught as a Culinary Management Instructor at the Institute of Culinary Education. In 2014, Caporale completed the first draft of the show to enter into the New York International Fringe Festival, where it was accepted to run for five performances. Following a critically acclaimed, sold-out run at FringeNYC, the show was selected for an extension in the 2014 Fringe Encore Series at SoHo Playhouse.

After completing a sold-out run at the Fringe Encore Series, the show opened Off-Broadway in November 2014. The Imbible garnered overwhelmingly positive critical response, and continues to play to capacity crowds at the SoHo Playhouse.

Productions

FringeNYC (2014)
The Imbible premiered at the 2014 New York International Fringe Festival at the Celebration of Whimsey theater on August 8, 2014. The production was directed by Nicole DiMattei, with production design by Michael Leslie. The show was originally headlined by Anthony Caporale in the leading role, with The Backwaiters played by DiMattei, Ruthellen Cheney, and Ariel Estrada.

Fringe Encore Series (2014)
The Fringe Encore Series began on September 5, 2014 at the SoHo Playhouse in SoHo, Manhattan, New York. The show retained its original cast, and was originally booked for five performances through October 3, 2014. After selling out all five nights, it was extended for three additional performances through October 24, 2014.

Off-Broadway (2014–2020)
Due to its prior successful runs, the show remained at the SoHo Playhouse to open Off-Broadway on November 21, 2014. Caporale, DiMattei, and Cheney remained in the cast, which was expanded to add Alessandra Migliaccio and Kristie Wortman as swings. Estrada was replaced by alternates Will Allen and Mark Edwards. In October 2016 the show moved to "The Green Room" at the New World Stages complex on 50th Street where it enjoyed an open run until March of 2020 when all New York theatre shut down due to the COVID-19 pandemic. As of 2023, it has yet to return to New World Stages.

Hornblower Alive After Five City Cruises (2015–)
The show's sequel, The Imbible: Pirate Drinks, was selected as the entertainment for Hornblower Cruises Alive After Five New York City cruises beginning in the summer of 2015. Supporting cast members from the Off-Broadway production will swing in and out of the sequel, with Caporale occasionally making guest appearances as well. The show was booked through October 2015 for its initial engagement.

Characters and cast members 
The cast members of all productions of The Imbible.

Reception 
The Imbible received broad critical and audience praise for the plot, musical performances, actors' performances, and novel approach to education. Time Out New York called the show "remarkably compelling" and named it a Critics' Pick. Cocktailians.com said the show was "rollicking, charming, and delivers a ton of information." Lance Evans of StageBuddy reported, "The Imbible is educational and rip-roaring funny, with a talented and generous dose of song and dance."

Michael Niederman of New York Theatre Review notes, "Caporale takes us on a millennia-long journey into just how much Western civilization has been influenced by the introduction and preservation of alcohol consumption. Basically, it is his thesis that without alcohol, it is very likely that we wouldn’t even have a civilization. In short, the regular consumption of alcoholic beverages made it possible for human beings to, in his words, 'not die'."

Awards and nominations

Off-Broadway production

See also 

Art of the Drink

References

External links 
 
Producer's website
Playwright's website
Venue website
"To Binge at the Fringe", The New York Times, August 11, 2014
"The Imbible - A Spirited History of Drinking", Theatre Is Easy, August 23, 2014
"The Imbible: A Spirited History of Drinking FringeNYC", NiteLifeExchange.com
"The Imbible: A Spirited History of Drinking", Front Row Center, August 16, 2014
"The Imbible: A Spirited History of Drinking ", NYTheater Now, August 10, 2014
"Fringe NYC Mid-Festival Report", Maxamoo, August 19, 2014

2014 musicals
Alcohol in the United States
History of alcoholic drinks
Off-Broadway musicals